Dwight is a city in Morris County, Kansas, United States.  As of the 2020 census, the population of the city was 217.

History
Dwight had its start in the year 1887 by the building of the Chicago, Kansas and Nebraska Railway through that territory. It was named for Dwight Rathbone, the owner of the original town site. Dwight was incorporated as a city in 1903.

The Chicago, Kansas and Nebraska Railway was foreclosed in 1891 and taken over by Chicago, Rock Island and Pacific Railway, which shut down in 1980 and reorganized as Oklahoma, Kansas and Texas Railroad, merged in 1988 with Missouri Pacific Railroad, merged in 1997 with Union Pacific Railroad.  Most locals still refer to this railroad as the "Rock Island".

A post office was established in Dwight on March 19, 1887.

Geography
Dwight is located at  (38.844602, -96.594935).

Demographics

2010 census
As of the census of 2010, there were 272 people, 117 households, and 79 families residing in the city. The racial makeup of the city was 93.0% White, 1.5% African American, 0.4% Native American, 0.7% Asian, 0.4% from other races, and 4.0% from two or more races. Hispanic or Latino of any race were 4.8% of the population.

There were 117 households, of which 27.4% had children under the age of 18 living with them, 50.4% were married couples living together, 10.3% had a female householder with no husband present, 6.8% had a male householder with no wife present, and 32.5% were non-families. 28.2% of all households were made up of individuals, and 18.8% had someone living alone who was 65 years of age or older. The average household size was 2.32 and the average family size was 2.78.

The median age in the city was 45.1 years. 21.3% of residents were under the age of 18; 10% were between the ages of 18 and 24; 18.3% were from 25 to 44; 27.3% were from 45 to 64; and 23.2% were 65 years of age or older. The gender makeup of the city was 50.4% male and 49.6% female.

2000 census

As of the census of 2000, there were 330 people, 143 households, and 90 families residing in the city. The racial makeup of the city was 94.85% White, 0.30% African American, 0.61% Native American, 0.61% Asian, 1.52% from other races, and 2.12% from two or more races. Hispanic or Latino of any race were 4.85% of the population.

There were 143 households, out of which 29.4% had children under the age of 18 living with them, 53.1% were married couples living together, 6.3% had a female householder with no husband present, and 36.4% were non-families. 33.6% of all households were made up of individuals, and 14.7% had someone living alone who was 65 years of age or older. The average household size was 2.31 and the average family size was 2.96.

In the city, the population was spread out, with 24.2% under the age of 18, 9.1% from 18 to 24, 26.4% from 25 to 44, 23.0% from 45 to 64, and 17.3% who were 65 years of age or older. The median age was 39 years. For every 100 females, there were 100.0 males. For every 100 females age 18 and over, there were 96.9 males.

The median income for a household in the city was $25,909, and the median income for a family was $38,750. Males had a median income of $25,000 versus $20,227 for females. The per capita income for the city was $14,727. About 9.4% of families and 15.1% of the population were below the poverty line, including 17.7% of those under age 18 and 3.3% of those age 65 or over.

Government
The Dwight government consists of a mayor and five council members.  The council meets the 3rd Monday of each month at 7PM.

Education
The community is served by Morris County USD 417 public school district.  The district high school is Council Grove High School.

Dwight schools were closed through school unification. The Dwight Rockets won the Kansas State High School boys class BB basketball championship in 1966 and 1967.

References

Further reading

External links

 City of Dwight
 Dwight - Directory of Public Officials
 Historic Images of Dwight, Special Photo Collections at Wichita State University Library
 Dwight city map, KDOT

Cities in Kansas
Cities in Morris County, Kansas